Rob Das (born 12 May 1969, in Delft, Netherlands) is a Dutch film and television actor, director and writer. His movie appearances include in The Damned (2002), Baby Blue (2001), and De Zwarte Meteoor (2000). His TV appearances include in the miniseries Anne Frank: The Whole Story (2001), Fort Alpha (1996) and Vuurzee (2006). Besides, Das has also worked as the assistant director in the TV movies Gezocht: Man (2005) and Deining (2004), and served as both the writer and director for the short movie Veilig Rijen (1997).

One of the mostly known appearance of Das was as Jan Gies in the ABC miniseries Anne Frank: The Whole Story. The miniseries, which earned much fame, has been called "the best Anne Frank movie or miniseries" and it has been nominated for several Golden Globe awards, and it won an Emmy Award. Das starred alongside Ben Kingsley, Brenda Blethyn and Lili Taylor.

Recently, Rob Das has been reprising the role of Jan Gies in ANNE, a Dutch-language play based on Anne Frank's diary.

Filmography

As actor
Theatre
 Beginners (2018) as Bart
 ANNE (2014 - 2016) as Jan Gies
 De donkere kamer van Damokles (2013)
Television
 Recht Voor z'n Raab (1 episode, 1993) as Peter
 Fort Alpha (1996) as Peter de Weerd
 Russen (1 episode, 2000) as Johnny Zweers
 Anne Frank: The Whole Story (2001) as Jan Gies
 Baantjer (2 episodes, 1995–2002)
 Zes Minuten (1 episode, 2004) as Bert
 Vuurzee (7 episodes, 2005–2006) as Tom
 Wijster (2008) as Wouter
Film
 Eveline (1995)
 De Fiets (1997)
 fl 19,99 (1998) as Jeroen Hofstra
 De Zwarte Meteoor (2000) as Jaap Roele
 Baby Blue (2001)
 The Damned (Zatracení) (2002) as Gert
 15.35: spoor 1 (2003) as Gymleraar
 Rânia (2011) as Belga

As director
 Veilig Rijen (1997) (and as writer)
 Juggernaut (2003)

As editor
 Once We Get There (2015) (and scenario)
 Rafina (2011)
 Rânia (2011)

As assistant director
 Sale (2003)
 Deining (2004)
 Gezocht: Man (2005)
 Vuurzee (12 episodes, 2005–2006)

References

External links

1969 births
Living people
Dutch film directors
Dutch male film actors
Dutch male television actors
People from Delft